Cégep Beauce-Appalaches is a CEGEP in Saint-Georges, Quebec, Canada.

History
The college traces its origins to the merger of several institutions which became public ones in 1967, when the Quebec system of CEGEPs was created.

Programs

The Province of Quebec awards a Diploma of Collegial Studies for two types of programs: two years of pre-university studies or three years of vocational (technical) studies. The pre-university programs, which take two years to complete, cover the subject matters which roughly correspond to the additional year of high school given elsewhere in Canada in preparation for a chosen field in university. The technical programs, which take three-years to complete, applies to students who wish to pursue a skilled trade.

See also
List of colleges in Quebec 
Higher education in Quebec

References

External links
Cégep Beauce-Appalaches Website - in French

Beauce-Appalaches
Saint-Georges, Quebec
Buildings and structures in Chaudière-Appalaches